Dorycera maculipennis is a species of picture-winged fly in the genus Dorycera of the family Ulidiidae found in 
Cyprus, Greece, Italy, and Spain.

References

maculipennis
Insects described in 1843
Diptera of Europe